Payyanadam is a village in Palakkad district in the Indian state of Kerala.

Location
Payyanadam is situated on the right bank of the river Kunthi and it is located at distance of 3 km from NH 213.

Demographics
 India census, Payyanadam had a population of 13,344 with 6,359 males and 6,985 females.

Administration
Administratively, Payyanadam falls under the Kumaramputhur gram panchayat.

Festivals
Ucharal vela at Sree Kurumba Bhagavathi temple
Sivaratri at Enanimagalam siva temple 
Perunal at St. Joseph church
SreeKrishna Jayanthi Procession from Enanimagalam siva temple to Sree Kurumba Bhagavathi temple

References

Villages in Palakkad district